The B1159 is a road in Norfolk, England, running for about  between Cromer and Caister-on-Sea, parallel to and at a short distance from the northeastern coast of Norfolk.

From north to south the road passes through:
Overstrand
Sidestrand
Trimingham
Mundesley
Paston
Bacton
Keswick
Walcott
Happisburgh
Whimpwell Green
Lessingham
Ingham Corner
Sea Palling
Horsey Corner
Horsey
West Somerton
East Somerton
Winterton-on-Sea
Hemsby
Dowe Hill
Scratby

Sections of interest (north to south)

From about halfway between Cromer and Overstrand to Mundesley, the road parallels the disused course of the Norfolk and Suffolk Joint Railway, which can be glimpsed from time to time.

Between Paston and Bacton, "the road runs through acres of gasholders, pipes, control wheels and other gadgetry, all protected by formidable fences. This is the Bacton Natural Gas Terminal, which receives gas through pipelines from the offshore wells.". The site is also one terminal of the Interconnector pipeline link with continental Europe.

A quarter-mile stretch at Walcott is a section of this "coast road" that runs in close proximity to the sea, although somewhat more distant sea views are available at numerous other points, such as at Sidestrand, Trimingham and Mundesley

See also
B roads in Zone 1 of the Great Britain numbering scheme

Notes and references
Primary references
 1:50,000 First Series Sheet 133 North East Norfolk, Ordnance Survey, 1974 – Cromer – Ingham Corner.
 1:50,000 Landranger Sheet 134 Norwich & The Broads (Great Yarmouth), Edition C1, Ordnance Survey, 2000 – Whimpwell Green – Caister-on-Sea.
 Touring Guide to Britain, AA Publishing, 1986, in which the B1159 forms half of Tour 64.

Inline references

External links

Photos taken along the road at Geograph.org

Roads in England
Transport in Norfolk